Joseph Keith Symons (born October 14, 1932) is an American prelate of the Roman Catholic Church.  Symons served as bishop of the Diocese of Palm Beach in Florida from 1990 to 1998.  Previously, he served as an auxiliary bishop of the Diocese of St. Petersburg in Florida for several months in 1981, then was appointed bishop of the Diocese of Pensacola-Tallahassee in Florida in October 1981. 

In 1998, Symons sent a letter of resignation as bishop of the Diocese of Palm Beach to Pope John Paul II after admitting he sexually abused five boys earlier in his career.

Biography

Early life 
Joseph Symons was born in Champion Township, Michigan, on October 14, 1932. He was ordained a priest by Archbishop Joseph Hurley for the Diocese of St. Augustine on May 18, 1958.  In 1971, Symons became chancellor of the Diocese of St. Petersburg.

Auxiliary Bishop of St. Petersburg 
On January 16, 1981  John Paul II appointed Symons as the titular bishop of Sigus and as an auxiliary bishop of the Diocese of St. Petersburg. He was consecrated by Bishop William Larkin on March 19, 1981. Archbishops Edward McCarthy and Thomas Joseph McDonough were the co-consecrators.

Bishop of Pensacola-Tallahassee 
On October 4, 1983, John Paul II appointed Symons as the second bishop of the Diocese of Pensacola-Tallahassee.  He was installed on November 8, 1983.

Bishop of Palm Beach 
On June 12, 1990, John Paul II appointed Symons as the second bishop of the Diocese of Palm Beach.  He was installed on July 31, 1990.  Symons served as a member of the Committee for Latin America, part of the National Council of Catholic Bishops. He also was a member of the Southeast Pastoral Institute in Miami, Florida, which provides outreach to Hispanics.

In 1991, Symons authorized the taping of an exorcism. The rite was performed by Reverend James J. LeBar and other priests on a 16-year-old girl known as "Gina". Footage of the exorcism was then broadcast on ABC's 20/20 TV program. In allowing the taping, Symons said that he hoped it would help "counteract diabolical activities around us."

In 1996, a husband and wife charged that years earlier Symons, when serving as auxiliary bishop of St. Petersburg, had ignored their report that a diocese priest had abused their children, then tried to bribe the couple by offering to pay for therapy for their sons. Symons said he had the priest submit to a psychiatric evaluation.

In April 1998, a 53 year old man informed a priest and Archbishop John C. Favalora that Symons had sexually abused him when he was an altar server decades earlier.  When confronted about the allegations, Symons admitted his guilt. The Vatican immediately asked Bishop Robert N. Lynch of the Diocese of St. Petersburg to hear Symons' confession.  During that session, Symons admitted that he had abused four other boys.  He also said that he had confessed the abuses to a priest at the time, but the priest simply told Symons to avoid alcohol and remain chaste.  According to Lynch, the molestations all took place in the Diocese of Pensacola-Tallahassee.

Resignation and legacy 
On June 2, 1998,  Lynch announced that John Paul II had accepted Symons' resignation as bishop of the Diocese of Palm Beach and named Lynch as apostolic administrator of the diocese. Symons issued a written statement that said:
After his resignation, Symons was to be sent away for treatment and counseling.

On July 30, 1998, the St. Petersburg Times reported that Symons’ accuser had first complained to the church about Symons in 1995.   Bishop John M. Smith, then bishop of the Diocese of Pensacola-Tallahassee, brokered a meeting between Symons and his accuser.  In the meeting, Symons admitted his guilt.  However, he denied molesting other youths (which he admitting doing later in 1998) and promised to get counseling, which he never did until after his resignation.

References

External links
Roman Catholic Diocese of Palm Beach Official Site

1932 births
Living people
20th-century Roman Catholic bishops in the United States
Catholic Church sexual abuse scandals in the United States
People from Marquette County, Michigan
Roman Catholic Diocese of Saint Augustine
Roman Catholic bishops of Palm Beach
Roman Catholic bishops of Pensacola–Tallahassee
Catholics from Michigan